The 2022 Labour Party leadership election was a leadership election within Ireland's Labour Party that was triggered when Alan Kelly stepped down as Labour leader on 2 March 2022, citing a lack of confidence in his leadership from party colleagues as the reason.

After nominations closed on 24 March, Ivana Bacik was declared the new leader of the Labour Party after becoming the sole candidate.

Background 
On 2 March 2022, Alan Kelly announced his resignation as party leader, citing a lack of confidence in his leadership from party colleagues as the reason. He announced he would stay on as leader until a replacement was appointed, and would remain as a TD for Tipperary.

Candidates

Confirmed

Results

References

2022 elections in the Republic of Ireland
2022 in Irish politics
Labour Party (Ireland)
Labour Party leadership elections (Ireland)
Labour Party leadership election (Ireland)